The IPSC Hellenic Tournament Championship is an IPSC level 3  championship held once a year by the Hellenic Shooting Federation.

Champions 
The following is a list of current and previous champions.

Overall category

See also 
Hellenic Handgun Championship
Hellenic Shotgun Championship
Hellenic Tournament Championship

References 

Match Results - 2010 IPSC Hellenic Rifle Championship
Match Results - 2013 IPSC Hellenic Rifle Championship
Match Results - 2014 IPSC Hellenic Rifle Championship
Match Results - 2015 IPSC Hellenic Rifle Championship
Match Results - 2016 IPSC Hellenic Rifle Championship
Match Results - 2017 IPSC Hellenic Rifle Championship

IPSC shooting competitions
National shooting championships
Greece sport-related lists
Shooting competitions in Greece